The 13th Kisei was a Go competition that took place in 1989. Koichi Kobayashi won the title 4 games to 1 over Masaki Takemiya.

Tournament

Challenger finals

Finals 

Kisei (Go)
1989 in go